Kilbil St Joseph's High School is a co-educational English medium private school in Nashik, Maharashtra, India that was established in 1975. It is run by the Ursuline Sisters of Mary Immaculate and under the religious jurisdiction of the Roman Catholic Diocese of Nashik. It teaches classes from LKG to Std. 10th and leads up to the Secondary School Certificate, conducted by the Maharashtra State Board of Secondary and Higher Secondary Education.

Since early 1998, the school has seen 100% SSC pass results and celebrated their Silver Jubilee anniversary in the year 2001 with great pomp and show.

Facilities 
 Prayer room
 Science labs for Biology, Physics and Chemistry and also demonstration hall
 Computer lab
 Hall for yoga or dance practice
 Audio visual room, geography room
 Playground and basketball court
 Ground floor hall and mother brigida hall
 E-learning (Teach Next)
 Assembly Court

References

External links 
 
 https://web.archive.org/web/20061101212555/http://education.vsnl.com/kilbilschool/infrastructure.html

Primary schools in India
Christian schools in Maharashtra
Schools in Nashik
Educational institutions established in 1975
1975 establishments in Maharashtra